Princeton Train Station can refer to:
Princeton (NJT station), The terminus of the Princeton Branch, including the two previous stations from 1865 and 1914.  
Princeton Junction (NJT station), A station on the Northeast Corridor located at the junction with the Princeton branch.